Willard Robertson (January 1, 1886 – April 5, 1948) was an American actor and writer. He appeared in more than 140 films between 1924 and 1948. He was born in Runnels, Texas, and died in Hollywood, California.

Biography
Robertson first worked as a lawyer in Texas, but he left his profession for a sudden interest in acting after being encouraged to do so by Joseph Jefferson.

Robertson's initial venture onto the stage did not last, however. He returned to the practice of law as an attorney with the Interstate Commerce Commission. During World War I, he was an administrator in the Chicago office of the federal railway police.

He appeared on Broadway in 16 plays between 1907 and 1930. Robertson played supporting roles in many Hollywood films from 1930 until the year he died, typically portraying men of authority such as doctors, elected officials, military officers, and lawyers. He played Jackie Cooper's stern but loving father in the oscar-winning drama Skippy (1931) and its sequel Sooky (1931). Robertson also portrayed a flamboyant lawyer in Remember the Night (1940) and the straight sheriff in The Ox-Bow Incident (1943).

Robertson wrote the novel Moon Tide (1940) which was turned into Archie Mayo's drama thriller Moontide (1942) starring Jean Gabin and Ida Lupino.

Selected filmography

Daughters of the Night (1924) as Prof. Woodbury
The Last of the Duanes (1930) as Texas Ranger Captain
Once a Sinner (1931) as Speaker at Party (uncredited)
Fair Warning (1931) as Tex Calder
Skippy (1931) as Dr. Herbert Skinner
City Streets (1931) as Detective (uncredited)
The Lawyer's Secret (1931) as Police Desk Sergeant (uncredited)
Murder by the Clock (1931) as Police Captain (uncredited)
Silence (1931) as Phil Powers
Shanghaied Love (1931) as Newman
Graft (1931) as E. T. Scudder
The Ruling Voice (1931) as Ed Bailey
The Cisco Kid (1931) as Enos Hankins
Sooky (1931) as Mr. Skinner
The Gay Caballero (1932) as Major Lawrence Blount
Behind the Mask (1932) as Capt. E.J. Hawkes
Steady Company (1932) as Pop Henley
The Broken Wing (1932) as Sylvester Cross
The Rider of Death Valley (1932) as Bill Joyce
So Big (1932) as The Doctor (scenes deleted)
The Famous Ferguson Case (1932) as Sheriff
The Texas Bad Man (1932) as Milton Keefe
Tom Brown of Culver (1932) as Capt. White
Doctor X (1932) as Detective O'Halloran
Guilty as Hell (1932) as Police Sgt. Alcock
Okay, America! (1932) as Bit Role
Wild Girl (1932) as Red Pete
Virtue (1932) as MacKenzie
I Am a Fugitive from a Chain Gang (1932) as Prison Board Chairman
The Strange Love of Molly Louvain (1932)
Central Park (1932)
If I Had a Million (1932) as Fred - Glidden Associate (uncredited)
Call Her Savage (1932) as Pete Springer
Silver Dollar (1932) as Al - Yates' Office Manager (uncredited)
Frisco Jenny (1932) as Capt. of Police
Born to Fight (1932) as Dad Kinney
Destination Unknown (1933) as Joe Shano
Central Airport (1933) as Havana Airport Manager
Trick for Trick (1933) as Dr. Frank Fitzgerald
Supernatural (1933) as Prison Warden
Heroes for Sale (1933) as The Sheriff (scenes deleted)
Another Language (1933) as Harry Hallam
Tugboat Annie (1933) as Red Severn
Wild Boys of the Road (1933) as Captain of Detectives
The Mad Game (1933) as Warden
Ever in My Heart (1933) as Kennel Caretaker
Female (1933) as Department Head (uncredited)
The World Changes (1933) as Mr. Peterson
Roman Scandals (1933) as Warren Finley Cooper
 East of Fifth Avenue (1933) as Dr. Morgan
Lady Killer (1933) as Detective Conroy
Two Alone (1934) as George Marshall
Dark Hazard (1934) as Bill 'Billy' Fallen
Heat Lightning (1934) as Everett Marshall
Gambling Lady (1934) as District Attorney
Whirlpool (1934) as Judge Jim Morrison
Upper World (1934) as Police Capt. Reynolds
I'll Tell the World (1934) as Hardwick
 One Is Guilty (1934) as Wells Deveroux
He Was Her Man (1934) as Police Captain (uncredited)
Let's Talk It Over (1934) as Dr. Preston
Wild Gold (1934) as Dam Boss (uncredited)
Operator 13 (1934) as Capt. Channing
Murder in the Private Car (1934) as Elwood Carson aka Hanks
Here Comes the Navy (1934) as Executive Officer
Housewife (1934) as Judge
Have a Heart (1934) as Mr. Schauber
Death on the Diamond (1934) as Cato
Elinor Norton (1934) as Ranch Foreman (uncredited)
Mills of the Gods (1934) as Thomas
The Secret Bride (1934) as Representative Grosvenor
 Million Dollar Baby (1934) as Doctor
Biography of a Bachelor Girl (1935) as Grigsby, the Process Server
Transient Lady (1935) as Ed Goring
Laddie (1935) as Mr. John Stanton
Straight from the Heart (1935) as District Attorney
Black Fury (1935) as Mr. J.J. Welsh
Oil for the Lamps of China (1935) as Speaker
Dante's Inferno (1935) as Inspector Harris
The Virginia Judge (1935) as Plato Jones
O'Shaughnessy's Boy (1935) as Dan Hastings
His Night Out (1935) as J.J. Trent
The Old Homestead (1935) as Uncle Jed
Forced Landing (1935) as Martin Byrd
Dangerous Waters (1936) as Bill MacKeechie
Three Godfathers (1936) as Rev. McLane
The First Baby (1936) as Dr. Clarke
I Married a Doctor (1936) as Guy Pollock
The Last of the Mohicans (1936) as Captain Winthrop
The Gorgeous Hussy (1936) as Secretary Ingham
The Man Who Lived Twice (1936) as Police Insp. Logan
Wanted! Jane Turner (1936) as Walter Davies
Winterset (1936) as Policeman in the Square
That Girl from Paris (1936) as Immigration Officer (uncredited)
Larceny on the Air (1937) as Inspector 'Mac' McDonald
John Meade's Woman (1937) as The Governor
Park Avenue Logger (1937) as Ben Morton
The Go Getter (1937) as Matt Peasely
This Is My Affair (1937) as George Andrews
Roaring Timber (1937) as Harrigan
Exclusive (1937) as Mr. Franklin
Hot Water (1937) as Dr. Enfield
The Last Gangster (1937) as Mr. Broderick (uncredited)
Island in the Sky (1938) as Walter Rhodes
Gangs of New York (1938) as Inspector Sullivan
You and Me (1938) as Dayton
Men with Wings (1938) as Col. Hadley
Torchy Gets Her Man (1938) as Charles Gilbert
Kentucky (1938) as Bob Slocum
Jesse James (1939) as Clarke
My Son Is a Criminal (1939) as Tom Halloran Sr.
Union Pacific (1939) as Oakes Ames
Heritage of the Desert (1939) as 'Nebraska'
Each Dawn I Die (1939) as Lang
Range War (1939) as Buck Collins
Two Bright Boys (1939) as Clayton
Main Street Lawyer (1939) as John Ralston
The Cat and the Canary (1939)
Remember the Night (1940) as Francis X. O'Leary
My Little Chickadee (1940) as Uncle John
Castle on the Hudson (1940) as Ragan
Lucky Cisco Kid (1940) as Judge McQuade
Brigham Young (1940) as Heber Kimball
Northwest Mounted Police (1940) as Supt. Harrington
The Monster and the Girl (1941) as Lieutenant Strickland
I Wanted Wings (1941) as Judge Advocate
Men of the Timberland (1941) as Tim MacGregor
Texas (1941) as Rancher Wilson
The Night of January 16th (1941) as Inspector Donegan
Sullivan's Travels (1941) as Judge (uncredited)
Juke Girl (1942) as Mister Just
Wake Island (1942) as Col. Cameron (uncredited)
No Time for Love (1943) as Construction Company President (uncredited)
Air Force (1943) as Colonel at Hickam Field
The Ox-Bow Incident (1943) as Sheriff Risley
Background to Danger (1943) as 'Mac' McNamara
Nine Girls (1944) as Capt. Brooks
Along Came Jones (1945) as Luke Packard
To Each His Own (1946) as Dr. Hunt
Perilous Holiday (1946) as Graeme
The Virginian (1946) as Judge Henry (uncredited)
Renegades (1946) as Nathan Brockway
Gallant Journey (1946) as Zachary Montgomery
My Favorite Brunette (1947) as Prison Warden
Deep Valley (1947) as Sheriff Akers
Sitting Pretty (1948) as Mr. Ashcroft
Fury at Furnace Creek (1948) as Gen. Leads

References

External links

 
 
 Willard Robertson at Turner Classic Movies
 
 

1886 births
1948 deaths
American male film actors
Male actors from Texas
20th-century American male actors
People from Runnels County, Texas
Male Western (genre) film actors